Şeker, meaning "sugar", is a masculine Turkish given name, which also appears as a surname.

Given name
 Şeker Ahmet Paşa, Turkish painter

Surname
 Alişan Şeker (born 1986), Turkish footballer
 Busem Şeker (born 1998), Turkish-German women's footballer
 Reyhan Şeker (born 1984), Turkish women's footballer

Turkish-language surnames
Turkish masculine given names